This is a list of members of the Irish House of Commons between 9 January 1798 and 31 December 1800. There were 300 MPs at a time in this period.

References
 
 

798